Obtuse may refer to:
 Obtuse angle, an angle of between 90 and 180 degrees
 Obtuse triangle, a triangle with an internal angle of between 90 and 180 degrees
 Obtuse leaf shape
 Obtuse tepal shape
 Obtuse barracuda, a ray-finned fish
 Obtuse, a neighborhood in Brookfield, Connecticut